The Hard Rock Hotel and Casino Biloxi is a casino and resort in Biloxi, Mississippi, United States. It is owned by Gaming and Leisure Properties and operated by Bally's Corporation, under franchise from Hard Rock International. It opened in 2007.

History
The resort was constructed in 2005 and originally scheduled to open on September 1 of that year. However, days before the scheduled grand opening, Hurricane Katrina struck the Gulf Coast, destroying the casino and damaging the resort.

Reconstruction and reopening of the property was in limbo for a time because of a legal dispute between owner Premier Entertainment and the trustee for bondholders on the property. Premier later began architectural work on a newly rebuilt facility, awaiting resolution of the dispute, prior to workers securing the property for the 2007 Atlantic hurricane season.

Rebuilding of the facility was completed, and the casino opened to the public on June 30, 2007.

3 Doors Down opened the hotel on July 5, 2007. Other concert performances in the first month of business included Kid Rock, Poison, Ratt, and Cheap Trick.

In 2014, Twin River Worldwide Holdings (later Bally's Corporation) bought the property from Leucadia National for $250 million. Twin River had sought to diversify itself geographically because its Rhode Island casino faced an increase in competition from casinos to be built in Massachusetts.

In 2023, Bally's sold the land and buildings to Gaming and Leisure Properties in a leaseback transaction.

Features

The newly restored facility is built on "more storm resistant" cement pilings rather than the former floating barge as originally mandated by Mississippi law, and features seven restaurants, including a Hard Rock Cafe, Ruth's Chris Steak House, Half Shell Oysters House, close to 500 hotel rooms and suites, a full service spa, a nightclub, over 1400 slot machines, 56 table games, outdoor beach themed pool with cabanas and swim-up bar, and a Hard Rock Live performance arena. (The poker room was closed Labor Day Weekend, 2016.) The height of the hotel is  Steelman Partners was the architect, and interior designers and shop12 was the lighting designers

It survived the wrath of Hurricane Katrina largely intact, and was restored and repaired during the property's reconstruction.

Memorabilia
Among other memorabilia that was found by local residents and returned to the Hard Rock after Katrina was Elvis Presley's Army uniform , found on a mannequin floating in the Mississippi Sound. Also on display are B.B. King's original guitar "Lucille" returned as well along with guitars from Earl Thomas Conley, Dimebag Darrell, Johnny Cash, and Kiss, as well as clothing from Steven Tyler and Elton John, along with a composite hunting bow of Ted Nugent.

Some of the rock artifacts are in pristine condition, but others are part of a Katrina memorial collage.

Notes

External links

Hard Rock Cafe
Buildings and structures in Biloxi, Mississippi
Casinos in Mississippi
Hotels in Mississippi
Resorts in Mississippi
Tourist attractions in Harrison County, Mississippi
Casinos completed in 2005
Hotel buildings completed in 2007
Hotels established in 2007
Casino hotels
2007 establishments in Mississippi